The College of Health and Medicine is a college of the University of Tasmania that incorporates the School of Medicine, School of Health Sciences, Wicking Centre and Menzies Institute for Medical Research. The College incorporates medicine, pharmacy, psychology, paramedicine, nursing, laboratory medicine, allied health sciences and rural health into its curricula and research.

History

The first medical education offered at the University of Tasmania was the School of Medicine. The School was founded in 1965 to response to a workforce shortage of doctors in Tasmania.

Schools and Institutes

School of Medicine
The School of Medicine is predominately based at the Medical Science Precinct in Hobart which offers studies in Medicine, Pharmacy, Psychology and Paramedicine.

School of Health Sciences
The School of Health Sciences specialises in nursing, laboratory medicine, allied health sciences and rural health.

Wicking Centre
The Wicking Dementia Research and Education centre was founded in 2008 and focuses on the research, education and public understanding of dementia diseases.  The Centre undertakes this mission through free MOOC's and traditional territory education in a Diploma of Dementia Care, Bachelor of Dementia Care, Bachelor of Ageing and Dementia Studies and a Master of Dementia Program.

Menzies Institute

The Menzies Institute for Medical Research (formerly the Menzies Centre for Health Research) was founded in 1988. The Institute focuses on five major research themes: public health and primary care, brain diseases and injury, heart and blood vessels, bone and muscle health, and cancer, genetics and immunology.

Clinical schools and teaching hospitals 
Hobart Clinical School: Royal Hobart Hospital
Launceston Clinical School: Launceston General Hospital
Rural Clinical School: Mersey Community Hospital and the North West Regional Hospital
St. Vincent's Hospital, Darlinghurst Campus

References

External links 
 Official Website
 Menzies Institute
 Wicking Centre

Schools and Faculties of the University of Tasmania
Nursing schools in Australia
Medical schools in Australia